Vladimir Găitan (2 February 1947 – 10 November 2020) was a Romanian actor.

Born in Suceava, he studied at the Academy of Theatrical Arts and Cinematography in Bucharest, graduating in 1970.

Găitan appeared in more than forty films since 1968. He died on 10 November 2020 after fighting against lymphatic cancer, and was buried at Bellu Cemetery, in Bucharest.

Selected filmography

References

External links 

1947 births
2020 deaths
People from Suceava
Caragiale National University of Theatre and Film alumni
Romanian male film actors
20th-century Romanian male actors
21st-century Romanian male actors
Deaths from cancer in Romania
Burials at Bellu Cemetery